Aframomum colosseum is a monocotyledonous plant species the family Zingiberaceae first described by Karl Moritz Schumann.

References 

colosseum